The Tlingit (also spelled Tlinkit) are indigenous peoples of the Pacific Northwest Coast of North America. Their language is the Tlingit language (natively , pronounced ), in which the name means 'People of the Tides'. The Russian name  (from a Sugpiaq-Alutiiq term  for the labret worn by women) or the related German name  may be encountered referring to the people in older historical literature, such as Grigory Shelikhov's 1796 map of Russian America.

The Tlingit have a matrilineal kinship system, with children considered born into the mother's clan, and property and hereditary roles passing through the mother's line. Their culture and society developed in the temperate rainforest of the southeast Alaskan coast and the Alexander Archipelago. The Tlingit maintained a complex hunter-gatherer culture based on semi-sedentary management of fisheries. Hereditary slavery was practiced extensively until it was outlawed by the United States.  An inland group, known as the Inland Tlingit, inhabits the far northwestern part of the province of British Columbia and the southern Yukon in Canada.

Territory

The greatest territory historically occupied by the Tlingit extended from the Portland Canal along the present border between Alaska and British Columbia, north to the coast just southeast of the Copper River delta in Alaska. The Tlingit occupied almost all of the Alexander Archipelago, except the southernmost end of Prince of Wales Island and its surroundings, where the Kaigani Haida moved just before the first encounters with European explorers.

The Coastal Tlingit tribes controlled one of the mountain passes into the Yukon interior; they were divided into three tribes: the Chilkat Tlingit along the Chilkat River and on Chilkat Peninsula, the Chilkoot Tlingit and the Taku Tlingit along the Taku River.

Inland, the Tlingit occupied areas along the major rivers that pierce the Coast Mountains and Saint Elias Mountains and flow into the Pacific, including the Alsek, Tatshenshini, Chilkat, Taku, and Stikine rivers. With regular travel up these rivers, the Tlingit developed extensive trade networks with Athabascan tribes of the interior, and commonly intermarried with them. From this regular travel and trade, a few relatively large populations of Tlingit settled around Atlin, Teslin, and Tagish Lakes, whose headwaters flow from areas near the headwaters of the Taku River.

Delineating the modern territory of the Tlingit is complicated because they are spread across the border between the United States and Canada, they lack designated reservations, other complex legal and political concerns make the situation confusing, and there is a relatively high level of mobility among the population. They also overlap in territory with various Athabascan peoples, such as the Tahltan, Kaska and Tagish. In Canada, the modern communities of Atlin, British Columbia (Taku River Tlingit), Teslin, Yukon (Teslin Tlingit Council), and Carcross, Yukon (Carcross/Tagish First Nation) have reserves and are the representative Interior Tlingit populations.

The territory occupied by the modern Tlingit people in Alaska is not restricted to particular reservations, unlike most tribes in the lower contiguous 48 states. This is the result of the Alaska Native Claims Settlement Act (ANCSA), which established regional corporations throughout Alaska with complex portfolios of land ownership rather than bounded reservations administered by tribal governments. The corporation in the Tlingit region is Sealaska Corporation, which serves the Tlingit as well as the Haida and Tsimshian in Alaska.

Tlingit people as a whole participate in the commercial economy of Alaska. As a consequence, they live in typically American nuclear family households with private ownership of housing and land. Many also possess land allotments from Sealaska or from earlier distributions predating ANCSA. Despite the legal and political complexities, the territory historically occupied by the Tlingit can be reasonably designated as their modern homeland. Tlingit people today consider the land from around Yakutat south through the Alaskan Panhandle, and including the lakes in the Canadian interior, as being , the Land of the Tlingit.

The extant Tlingit territory can be roughly divided into four major sections, paralleling ecological, linguistic, and cultural divisions:

The Southern Tlingit occupy the region south of Frederick Sound, and live in the northernmost reaches of the Western Red cedar forest. 
Northern Tlingit live north of Frederick Sound to Cape Spencer, and including Glacier Bay and the Lynn Canal; they occupy the warmest and richest of the Sitka Spruce and Western Hemlock forests. 
The Inland Tlingit live along large interior lakes and the drainage of the Taku River as well as in the southern Yukon, and subsist in a manner similar to their Athabascan neighbors in the mixed spruce taiga. 
The Gulf Coast Tlingit live along a narrow strip of coastline backed by steep mountains and extensive glaciers, north of Cape Spencer, and along the coast of the Gulf of Alaska to Controller Bay and Kayak Island. Their territory can be battered by Pacific storms.

The trade and cultural interactions between each of these Tlingit groups and their disparate neighbors, the differences in food harvest practices, and dialectical differences in language contribute to these identifications. These academic classifications are supported by similar self-identification among the Tlingit.

Tribes or

Culture

The Tlingit culture is multifaceted and complex, a characteristic of Northwest Pacific Coast people with access to easily exploited rich resources. In Tlingit culture a heavy emphasis is placed upon family and kinship, and on a rich oratory tradition. Wealth and economic power are important indicators of rank, but so is generosity and proper behavior, all signs of "good breeding" and ties to aristocracy. Art and spirituality are incorporated in nearly all areas of Tlingit culture, with even everyday objects such as spoons and storage boxes decorated and imbued with spiritual power and historical beliefs of the Tlingits.

Tlingit society is divided into two moieties, the Raven and the Eagle. These in turn are divided into numerous clans, which are subdivided into lineages or house groups. They have a matrilineal kinship system, with descent and inheritance passed through the mother's line. These groups have heraldic crests, which are displayed on totem poles, canoes, feast dishes, house posts, weavings, jewelry, and other art forms. The Tlingits pass down  or blankets that represented trust. Only a Tlingit can inherit one but they can also pass it down to someone they trust, who becomes responsible for caring for it but does not rightfully own it.

Like other Northwest Coast native peoples, the Tlingit did practice hereditary slavery.

Philosophy and religion

Tlingit thought and belief, although never formally codified, was historically a fairly well organized philosophical and religious system whose basic axioms shaped the way Tlingit people viewed and interacted with the world around them. Tlingits were traditionally animists, and hunters ritually purified themselves before hunting animals. Shamans, primarily men, cured diseases, influenced weather, aided in hunting, predicted the future, and protected people against witchcraft.  A central part of the Tlingit belief system was the belief in reincarnation of both humans and animals.

Between 1886 and 1895, in the face of their shamans' inability to treat Old World diseases including smallpox, many Tlingit people converted to Orthodox Christianity. Russian Orthodox missionaries had translated their liturgy into the Tlingit language. It has been argued that they saw Eastern Orthodox Christianity as a way of resisting assimilation to the "American way of life", which was associated with Presbyterianism. After the introduction of Christianity, the Tlingit belief system began to erode.

Today, some young Tlingits look back towards their traditional tribal religions and worldview for inspiration, security, and a sense of identity. While many elders converted to Christianity, contemporary Tlingit "reconcile Christianity and the 'traditional culture.'"

Language

The Tlingit people of Southeast Alaska and Western Canada speak the Tlingit language (Lingít ), which is a branch of the Na-Dené language family. Lingít has a complex grammar and sound system and also uses certain phonemes unheard in almost any other language.

Tlingit has an estimated 200 to 400 native speakers in the United States and 100 speakers in Canada. The speakers are bilingual or near-bilingual in English. Tribes, institutions, and linguists are expending extensive effort into revitalization programs in Southeast Alaska to revive and preserve the Tlingit language and its culture. Sealaska Heritage Institute, Goldbelt Heritage Institute and the University of Alaska Southeast have Tlingit language programs, and community classes are held in Klukwan and Angoon.

Housing
Tlingit tribes historically built plank houses made from cedar and today call them clanhouses; these houses were built with a foundation such that they could store their belongings under the floors. It is said that these plank houses had no adhesive, nails, or any other sort of fastening devices. Clan houses were usually square or rectangular in shape and had front facing designs and totem poles to represent to which clan and moiety the makers belonged.

Economy 
Many Tlingit men work in the fishing industry while women are employed at canneries or in the local handicraft industry. These handicrafts include items like wood carvings and woven baskets which are sold for practical or tourist consumption.

History

Various cultures of indigenous people have continuously occupied the Alaska territory for thousands of years, leading to the Tlingit. Human culture with elements related to the Tlingit originated around 10,000 years ago near the mouths of the Skeena and Nass Rivers. The historic Tlingit's first contact with Europeans came in 1741 with Russian explorers. Spanish explorers followed in 1775. Tlingits maintained their independence but suffered from epidemics of smallpox and other infectious diseases brought by the Europeans. The 1862 Pacific Northwest smallpox epidemic killed about 60% of the Mainland Tlingit and 37% of the Island Tlingit.

Food

Food is a central part of Tlingit culture, and the land is an abundant provider. Most of the richness of intertidal life found on the beaches of Southeast Alaska can be harvested for food. Though eating off the beach could provide a fairly healthy and varied diet, eating nothing but "beach food" is considered contemptible among the Tlingit and a sign of poverty. Indeed, shamans and their families were required to abstain from all food gathered from the beach, and men might avoid eating beach food before battles or strenuous activities in the belief that it would weaken them spiritually and perhaps physically as well. Thus for both spiritual reasons as well as to add some variety to the diet, the Tlingit harvest many other resources for food besides those they easily find outside their front doors. No other food resource receives as much emphasis as salmon; however, seal and game are both close seconds.

Halibut, shellfish, and seaweed traditionally provided food in the spring, while late spring and summer bring seal and salmon. Summer is a time for gathering wild and tame berries, such as salmonberry, soap berry, and currants. In fall, sea otters are hunted. Herring and eulachon are also important staples, that can be eaten fresh or dried and stored for later use. Fish provide meat, oil, and eggs. Sea mammals, such as sea lions and sea otters, are used for food and clothing materials. In the forests near their homes, Tlingit hunted deer, bear, mountain goats and other small mammals.

Genetics 
Genetic analyses of HLA I and HLA II genes as well as HLA-A, -B, and -DRB1 gene frequencies links the Ainu people of Japan to some Indigenous peoples of the Americas, especially to populations on the Pacific Northwest Coast such as Tlingit. The scientists suggest that the main ancestor of the Ainu and of the Tlingit can be traced back to Paleolithic groups in Southern Siberia.

Notable Tlingit people
 Elizabeth Peratrovich (1911–1958), civil rights advocate
 Yeilxaak (unknown–1791), the first chief of Klukwan to be encountered by Europeans
 X'unéi (unknown), a powerful Yakutat chief that went to war against Yeilxaak
 Louis Shotridge (1883–1937), a Tlingit nobleman and American art collector, a grandson of the chief Shotridge
 K'alyaan or Katlian (1773–unknown), a chief and leader who led the Tlingits against the Russians at the Battle of Sitka
 Esther Littlefield (1906–1997), artist, cultural interpreter
 Nora Marks Dauenhauer (1927–2017), poet, author, and scholar
 Ursala Hudson, Chilkat and Ravenstail weaver
 Larry McNeil (b. 1955), photographer
 Tillie Paul (1863–1952), civil rights advocate and educator
 William Paul (1885–1977), attorney
 Clarissa Rizal (1956–2016), Chilkat and Ravenstail weaver
 Walter Soboleff (1908–2011), scholar, elder, and religious leader
 Preston Singletary (b. 1963), glass artist
 Jennie Thlunaut (ca. 1891–1986), Chilkat weaver
 Byron Mallott (1943–2020), Lieutenant Governor of Alaska (2014–2018) 
 Ernestine Hayes (b. 1945), poet, memorist, and professor
 Dino Rossi (b. 1959), politician
 Martin Sensmeier (b. 1985), actor
 Todd Gloria (b. 1978), politician

See also

Chilkat weaving
Ravenstail weaving
Battle of Sitka (Tlingit Rebellion, 1802)
Battle of Port Gamble
History of the Tlingit
List of edible plants and mushrooms of southeast Alaska
Maritime fur trade
Tlingit clans
Alaska Native storytelling

Notes

References
 de Laguna, Fredericæ. "Tlingit." Suttles, Wayne, ed. Handbook of North American Indians, Vol. 7: Northwest Coast. Washington, D.C.: Smithsonian Institution, 1990: 203–28. .
 Boyd, Robert Thomas. The Coming of the Spirit of Pestilence: Introduced Infectious Diseases and Population Decline among Northwest Coast Indians, 1774–1874. Seattle: University of Washington Press, 1999. .
 Moss, Madonna. Northwest Coast: Archaeology as Deep History. Washington, D.C.: Society for American Archaeology, 2011.
 Pritzker, Barry M. A Native American Encyclopedia: History, Culture, and Peoples. Oxford: Oxford University Press, 2000: 286–7. .
 Kan, Sergei. "Shamanism and Christianity: Modern-Day Tlingit Elders Look at the Past." Klass, Morton and Maxine Wiesgrau, eds. Across the Boundaries of Belief: Contemporary Issues in the Anthropology of Religion. Boulder, CO: Westview Press, 1999. .

Further reading
 (Contributors Frederica De Laguna and Jean Low)
 

Alaskan Tlingit and Tsimshian Essay by Jay Miller - From the University of Washington Library

External links

Map and list of Tlingit Kwaans and territories
Tlingit Language and Culture Resources, Alaska Native Knowledge Network
 Anash Interactive—An online destination where users create comics, write stories, watch webisodes, download podcasts, play games, read stories and comics by other members, and find out about the Tlingit people of Canada.
Tlingit Myths and Texts, John R. Swanton, Bureau of American Ethnology Bulletin 39, 1909
Central Council Tlingit Haida Indian Tribes of Alaska
The Carving of the Raven Spirit Canoe, housed in the Smithsonian Institution Smithsonian Ocean Portal
The Tlingit Culture and Language with Resources

 
Native American tribes in Alaska
Alaska Native ethnic groups
First Nations in British Columbia
First Nations in Yukon